More is a 1998 short film created by Mark Osborne using stop motion animation. More has won several awards, and was nominated for an Academy Award as Best Animated Short Film in 1998.

Plot

More tells the story of an inventor who lives in a drab, colorless world. Day by day, he toils away in a harsh, dull, and dehumanizing job, his only savior being the memories of the bliss of childhood. But at night, he works secretly on an invention that could help him relive those memories and spread their joy to everyone in his despair-filled life.

When he finishes the invention, it changes the way people look at the world. His success changes him, however, because he loses an important part of himself.

Production and publication
More was written and directed by Mark Osborne, and created by a team that included, among others, Keith and Shannon Lowry, Rick Orner, Nick Peterson, and David Candelaria. Although it was only a 6-minute short, it was, as Osborne put it, an "absolutely massive undertaking"—as it was the first short to be shot using the IMAX format. In addition, it was filmed using stop motion, a much more time-consuming method than live-action filming techniques.

Filming More took nine months, and it was first screened in fall of 1998. While it had a positive critical reception—including an Academy Award nomination—commercial options proved limited once the initial hype died down.

Although More was subsequently included in the Short Cinema Journal #7: Utopia DVD, Osborne was receiving e-mails daily, asking for the short to be released on DVD. One of these was a writer  from Despair, Inc., complimenting him on his work, which led to an offer for Despair to fund DVD production and to sell DVDs on their website. The DVD thus created included three commentaries and an hour-long documentary on the creation of More. The film was also released on disk in the second issue of Wholphin Magazine.

Soundtrack
The song featured as background music is titled "Elegia". It was recorded by the band New Order on the 1985 album Low-Life.

Legacy
The film More was adapted into the music video for the song "Hell Bent" by Kenna.

Awards
More was awarded the following honors:
Sundance Film Festival - Special Jury Prize for Short Films
South by Southwest - Best Animated Short
Nominated - Academy Award for Best Animated Short Film
ResFest – Audience Award for Best Film, Grand Audience Prize for Best Film
Aspen Shorts Fest - Special Jury prize
World Fest Houston - Gold / Special Jury Prize for Shorts
USA Film Festival - Dallas - Grand Jury Prize for Shorts
Toronto International Short Film Fest - Best Animated Short, Best Short Overall
Stony Brook Film Fest - Best Short Film
Message to Man International Film Festival - Russia – Best International Debut Film
PhilaFilm - Philadelphia – Best Animated Short
Nominated - Annie Award for Best Animated Short Subject
St. Louis International Film Festival - Best Short Film
Uppsala International Short Film Festival/Sweden - Audience Award for Best Film
San Francisco Indie Fest – Audience Award

See also
List of stop-motion films
IMAX

References

External links

 More on YouTube
 Short of the Week article

1998 films
Stop-motion animated short films
IMAX short films
1998 short films
Clay animation films
Films directed by Mark Osborne
American animated short films
1998 animated films
1990s stop-motion animated films
1990s American films